A papad is an Indian deep fried dough of black gram bean flour, either fried or cooked with dry heat (flipped over an open flame) until crunchy. Other flours made from lentils, chickpeas, rice, tapioca, millet or potato are also used. Papad is typically served as an accompaniment to a meal in India, Pakistan, Bangladesh, Nepal, Sri Lanka and the Caribbean or as an appetizer, often with a dip such as chutneys or toppings, such as chopped onions and chili peppers, or they may be used as an ingredient in curries.

Etymology
Papad is likely derived from the Sanskrit word parpaṭa (पर्पट), meaning a flattened disc described in early Jain and Buddhist literature. Papad are known by several names in the various languages of India, e.g. appalam in Tamil; happala in Kannada; papadam (පපඩම්) in Sinhala; pappadam in Malayalam; appadam in Telugu; papad in Marathi, Punjabi and Gujarati; and pampada in Odia.

Spelling and pronunciation
Some divergence of transliteration may be noted in the third consonant in the Hindi/Urdu word pāpaṛ (Hindi: पापड़,). The sound is the retroflex flap , which is written in Hindi with the Devanagari letter ड़, and in Urdu script with the Perso-Arabic letter ڑ. Although in ISO 15919 the Hindi letter  is transliterated as <ṛ>, popular or nonstandard transliterations of Hindi use <d> for this sound. The occurrence of this consonant in the word  has given rise to two alternative spellings in English: papar (anglicized as "popper"), which reflects its phonology, and papad, which reflects its etymology.

Regional variations

Papad recipes vary from region to region and from households to households. They are typically made from a flour or paste derived from lentils, chickpeas, black gram, rice, or potatoes.

Salt and peanut oil are added to make a dough, which can be flavored with seasonings such as chili, cumin, garlic, or black pepper. Sometimes, baking soda or slaked lime are also added. The dough is shaped into thin, round flatbreads, dried, (traditionally in the sun), and can be cooked by deep frying, roasting over an open flame, toasting, or microwaving, depending on the desired texture.

Bikaner is the hub of chickpea and green gram papad manufacturing. Potato papad is made in Varanasi. Most sweet- and snack-selling national companies are also involved in this business. In the north, papads made in the city of Amritsar and its surrounds (Amritsari Papar Warian) are especially famous. The Lijjat Papad company, headquartered in Mumbai, is a major manufacturer, and is often cited as an exemplar of the women's empowerment movement in India, as it is run entirely by women.

In most Indian restaurants around the world, they are served as an appetizer with dips, which often include mango chutney, lime pickle, onion chutney, and raita. Masala papad with sev, onion, tomato and coriander leaves is one of India's most popular appetizers.

Ingredients and preparation
Papadam can be prepared from different ingredients and methods. Arguably, the most popular recipe uses flour ground from hulled split black gram mixed with black pepper, salt, and a small amount of vegetable oil and a food-grade alkali, and the mixture is kneaded. A well-kneaded dough is then flattened into very thin rounds and then dried and stored for later preparation and consumption. It may also contain rice, jackfruit, sago, etc., as main ingredients. 

Cracked black pepper, red chili powder, asafoetida, or cumin or sesame seeds are often used as flavoring agents. Papar (also called Happala in South India) is also made from rice flakes, ragi or horsegram.

Gallery

See also

References

External links
 

Indian snack foods
Pakistani breads
Pakistani fast food
Indian breads
Flatbreads
Unleavened breads
Indian fast food
Tamil cuisine
Kerala cuisine
Indian legume dishes
Karnataka cuisine
Telangana cuisine
Andhra cuisine
Sri Lankan legume dishes
Indo-Caribbean cuisine
Nepalese cuisine